Jonathan Craig Wyatt (born 20 December 1972) is a New Zealand runner. He is a six-time world mountain running champion and an eight-time winner of the world mountain running grand prix series.

Running career
Wyatt competed in the men's 5,000 metres at the 1994 Commonwealth Games, reaching the final, and finished sixth in the men's marathon race at the 2002 Commonwealth Games. He is a two-time Olympian, competing at the 1996 Summer Olympics in the 5,000 metres and at the 2004 Summer Olympics in the marathon. He holds the New Zealand national record in the 5K at 13:46, and is the former national record holder for the 10K and half marathon.

Wyatt is a five-time winner of the Red Bull Dolomitenmann race.

Post-running
Wyatt works for athletic brand La Sportiva. He became president of the World Mountain Running Association council in 2017.

Personal life
Wyatt is married to Italian sky runner and cross-country skier Antonella Confortola. They live in northern Italy with their daughter.

Achievements

Other results
Nuten Opp
 2007, 2008, 2009, 2010, 2011

References

External links
 

 New Zealand Olympic Committee
 Athletics: Vili and Willis seeing double
 Athletics NZ
 World Mountain Running Association
 Jonospulse CV page

1972 births
Athletes (track and field) at the 1994 Commonwealth Games
Athletes (track and field) at the 1996 Summer Olympics
Athletes (track and field) at the 2002 Commonwealth Games
Athletes (track and field) at the 2004 Summer Olympics
Living people
New Zealand mountain runners
New Zealand male long-distance runners
Olympic athletes of New Zealand
Athletes from Lower Hutt
New Zealand sky runners
Snowshoe runners
Tower runners
World Mountain Running Championships winners
World Long Distance Mountain Running Championships winners
Commonwealth Games competitors for New Zealand